is the incipit of the 4 March 1853 apostolic letter by which Pope Pius IX decreed the reestablishment of the episcopal hierarchy in the Netherlands. Through it, the administrative area formerly known as the Dutch Mission was divided into dioceses. Utrecht was raised, once more, to a Roman Catholic archdiocese, and received the four suffragan dioceses of Haarlem, 's-Hertogenbosch, Breda, and Roermond.

References

Documents of Pope Pius IX
Latin texts
1853 documents
1853 in Christianity